Gboyega Aribisogan is a Nigerian politician who served as speaker of the Ekiti State House of Assembly in November 2022. He is a two-term lawmaker representing  Ikole I constituency. Aribisogan who hails from Ijesha-Isu in Ikole Local Government Area, in the North senatorial district of Ekiti State was elected on 15 November 2022 as the speaker of the house following the demise of Funminiyi Afuye. He was impeached on 21 November 2022 six days after taking office.

References 

Ekiti State House of Assembly
Ekiti State
Year of birth missing (living people)
Living people